The 1987–88 Boston Bruins season was the Bruins' 64th season. The season involved participating in the Stanley Cup finals.

Off-season

NHL draft
Boston's draft picks at the 1987 NHL Entry Draft held at the Joe Louis Arena in Detroit, Michigan.

Regular season
The season will forever be remembered when on the night Phil Esposito's number 7 would retire, captain Ray Bourque went from wearing uniform number 7 to wearing uniform number 77.  Bourque would wear that number until the end of his career. This occurred on December 3, 1987. As for the game, the Bruins beat the New York Rangers 4–3, in which Esposito was the General Manager.

Final standings

Schedule and results

Player statistics

Regular season
Scoring

Goaltending

Playoffs
Scoring

Goaltending

Playoffs

Adams Division semi-finals
Buffalo Sabres vs. Boston Bruins

The Boston Bruins were led by team co-captains Ray Bourque, Rick Middleton and the goaltending duo of Réjean Lemelin and the newly acquired Andy Moog. The Buffalo Sabres returned to the playoffs thanks to added depth provided by rookie Ray Sheppard.

Boston wins best-of-seven series 4–2.

Adams Division Finals
Boston Bruins vs. Montreal Canadiens

The Wales Conference's two best teams, and the NHL's two best defensive teams, met in this series with equal rest time. The Habs had beaten Boston in the Adams Division Semi-finals four years in a row, sweeping the Bruins in three of the past four seasons, and beating them 3–2 in a best-of-five the other year. This time, the Bruins' defence would wear down Montreal, as Ken Linseman, Ray Bourque and Cam Neely provided the offence to finally conquer the Canadiens. It was the first Bruins' playoff series win over the Habs in 44 seasons.

Boston wins best-of-seven series 4–1.

Prince of Wales Conference Finals
New Jersey Devils vs. Boston Bruins

The Devils would take Boston to the limit, but their offense could not compete with the Bruins, who would make their first appearance in the Stanley Cup Finals since consecutive appearances in 1976–77 and 1977–78.

This series would also have the infamous confrontation between Devils head coach Jim Schoenfeld and referee Don Koharski after Game 3, when, during an argument in the tunnel after the game, Koharski tripped and fell, accusing Schoenfield of pushing him. Schoenfield famously responded, "You tripped and fell you fat pig!" He then yelled, "Have another doughnut! Have another doughnut!" The incident was played repeatedly on ESPN and has become part of NHL lore.

Schonefeld was suspended by NHL president John Ziegler for Game 4, but the Devils received an injunction from a New Jersey court, allowing Schoenfeld to coach the fourth game. In protest, the officials scheduled to work that game in the Meadlowands refused to take the ice, forcing the NHL to scramble for amateur officials to call the contest. The injunction was lifted and Schoenfeld served his suspension during Game 5 in the Boston Garden.

Boston wins best-of-seven series 4–3.

Stanley Cup Finals
Boston Bruins vs. Edmonton Oilers

Edmonton wins best-of-seven series 4–0–1.

Awards and records
 James Norris Memorial Trophy: || Ray Bourque
Ray Bourque, NHL First Team All-Star
Cam Neely, NHL Second Team All-Star

References
 Bruins on Hockey Database

Boston Bruins seasons
Boston Bruins
Boston Bruins
Eastern Conference (NHL) championship seasons
Bos
Boston Bruins
Boston Bruins
Bruins
Bruins